Stolen Holidays is a 2006 French drama film directed by Olivier Peyon.

Plot
Danielle (Bernadette Lafont), a grandmother in her sixties, is planning to take her two grandchildren to their father’s house for the Easter vacation. Since retiring as a schoolteacher, Danielle has regularly taken on this responsibility after her daughter’s divorce. This time, however, the children’s father is not there to welcome them, giving Danielle the opportunity to spend a bit more time with her grandchildren and to take them out for the day.

Jumping at every opportunity presented to them, Danielle soon transforms this day-outing into an impromptu holiday. Only what starts out as a fun adventure gradually turns into an inexorable deconstructing experience, and it soon becomes impossible for Danielle to contemplate taking the kids back…

Cast
 Bernadette Lafont as Danièle
 Adèle Csech as Marine
 Claude Brasseur as The stranger in the palace
 Lucas Franchi as Thomas
 Claire Nadeau as Nicole
 Éric Savin as Eric

References

External links
 

2006 films
French drama films
2000s French-language films
2006 drama films
2000s French films